Wonji Stadium is a multi-use stadium in Wonji, Oromia, Ethiopia.  It is used mostly for football matches and serves as the home stadium of Muger Cement and Wonji Sugar. It has a capacity of 14,000 people.

Multi-purpose stadiums in Ethiopia
Football venues in Ethiopia
Sport in Oromia Region